Henry Holland Buckman (1858–1914) was an attorney from Duval County, Florida, who became a member of the Florida Legislature and served on the Judiciary Committee.  Buckman is known for being the author of the Buckman Act, a 1905 law that reorganized higher education into three institutions, segregated by race and gender, as follows:

 the Florida Female College (the present Florida State University) for Caucasian women; 
 the State Normal and Industrial College for Colored Students (the present Florida Agricultural and Mechanical University) for African American men and women; and
 the University of the State of Florida (the present University of Florida) for Caucasian men.

The Buckman Act also created the Florida Board of Control, the state-wide governing body for Florida's universities and colleges, and the predecessor of today's Florida Board of Governors.  The gender separation aspect of the Buckman Act was later reversed by the Florida Legislature in 1947, when Florida State University and the University of Florida began to enroll both men and women. The legislature was compelled to expand the available capacity of both institutions to make room for the World War II veterans who wished to use the G.I. Bill to pursue university educations.  The racial segregation aspect of the Buckman Act was undone by the McLaurin v. Oklahoma State Regents and Brown v. Board of Education decisions of the U.S. Supreme Court.

Buckman was also instrumental in establishing a state road system in Florida and developing the St. Johns River channel.

Honors
Buckman Hall at the University of Florida, and the Buckman Bridge in Jacksonville, Florida are both named for Representative Buckman.
The Henry H. Buckman Lock is part of the Cross Florida Barge Canal project, also named in honor of Buckman.

Notes

1858 births
Florida lawyers
1914 deaths
People from Jacksonville, Florida
Members of the Florida House of Representatives
19th-century American politicians
19th-century American lawyers